Neothremma siskiyou, the Siskiyou caddisfly, is a species of insect found in the state of California.

References

Trichoptera
Endemic fauna of California
Fauna without expected TNC conservation status